The Ministry of Health was a government ministry of Southern Rhodesia first established in 1948, with the establishment of the Federation of Rhodesia and Nyasaland the responsibility for health was a federal responsibility from 1954 to 1963. The ministry returned to Southern Rhodesia from 1963 with the end of the Federation and then Rhodesia from the country's self-proclaimed independence in 1965 to 1979, when the country transitioned from white minority rule to the multiracial democracy of Zimbabwe.

List of Ministers of Health

References

Rhodesia
Ministries established in 1965
Ministries disestablished in 1979
1965 establishments in Rhodesia
1979 disestablishments in Rhodesia
Health